The MVM Dome, sometimes known as the Budapest Handball Sports Hall (Hungarian: Budapesti Kézilabda Sportcsarnok) and formally known as Budapest Multifunctional Arena, named after MVM Group, is Europe's largest handball arena located in Budapest, the capital city of Hungary.

Opened in December 2021, it hosted the 2022 European Men's Handball Championship, and will host the 2024 European Women's Handball Championship, the 2027 World Women's Handball Championship and the Final Four of the Women's EHF Champions League from 2022 onwards.

See also
 List of indoor arenas in Hungary

References

External links

Buildings and structures in Budapest
Indoor arenas in Hungary
Handball venues in Hungary
Sports venues in Budapest
Sports venues completed in 2021
2021 establishments in Hungary